Greg Maffei (born May 24, 1960) is an American businessman. He is the president and chief executive officer of Liberty Media and the chairman of Live Nation Entertainment, Sirius XM and TripAdvisor. He is the chairman emeritus of Starz and Expedia, as well as the former chief financial officer of Oracle and Microsoft.

Early life and education
Gregory B. Maffei was born on May 24, 1960. He received an AB from Dartmouth College and his MBA from Harvard Business School, where he was a Baker Scholar.
Maffei attended Groton School, an elite prep school in Groton, Massachusetts.

Business career
Maffei joined Liberty Media in 2005. He serves as its president and CEO. Liberty Media owns media, communications and entertainment businesses, including subsidiaries Formula 1, Sirius XM and the Atlanta Braves and an interest in Live Nation Entertainment. Maffei is also President and CEO of Liberty Broadband Corporation, which consists primarily of a stake in Charter Communications, and serves as Chairman and CEO of Liberty TripAdvisor, which holds a controlling interest in TripAdvisor.  Liberty  Broadband and Liberty TripAdvisor were spun off from Liberty Media and Liberty Interactive, respectively, in 2014.  In addition, Maffei serves as Executive Chairman of Qurate Retail, Inc., which owns digital commerce businesses, including subsidiaries QVC, HSN, Zulily and the Cornerstone Brands.

He also serves as chairman of the board of the Liberty-related companies, Live Nation Entertainment, Sirius XM and TripAdvisor, and as a director of Charter Communications and Zillow. Maffei has been leading the team in transforming these companies to compete in the digital/mobile era alongside Chairman John C. Malone.

Maffei is Vice Chair of the Board of Trustees of Dartmouth College and serves as Chair of the Finance Committee, and is a member of the Council on Foreign Relations. He previously served as President of the Board of Trustees of the Seattle Public Library.

Prior to joining Liberty Media, Maffei served as President and CFO of Oracle, Chairman, President and CEO of 360networks, CFO of Microsoft, and Chairman of the Board of Expedia. Maffei was the Chairman of the Board of Starz and a Director of Barnes & Noble, Citrix, DIRECTV, Dorling Kindersley, Electronic Arts, and Starbucks Coffee.

Personal life
Maffei lives in Colorado with his wife and children.

He donated $250,000 to Donald Trump's inauguration committee.

References

1960 births
American billionaires
American chief executives
American landowners
American philanthropists
AT&T people
Businesspeople from Colorado
Place of birth missing (living people)
Businesspeople from Connecticut
American chairpersons of corporations
Dartmouth College alumni
Liberty Media people
Living people
Harvard Business School alumni
Sirius XM